Shijiazhuang North railway station is one of the passenger railway stations in Shijiazhuang, the capital of Hebei province, China.

Shijiazhuang North is a smaller station than the city's main station, the Shijiazhuang railway station. It is used primarily by trains that come from the north (mostly from Beijing) or east  (e.g. from Shanghai via Dezhou) and continue west (toward Taiyuan and points west) without entering the city's main Shijiazhuang railway station.

Notes

Railway stations in Hebei
Shijiazhuang